Bedford or Nyarha is a rural town in the centre of the Eastern Cape province of South Africa. It was established in the mid-19th century when Sir Andries Stockenstroom sold portions of land from his farm Maastroom to raise funds for the restoration of his library, which had been burnt by British soldiers mistrustful of his attempts to broker peace in one of the Cape Frontier Wars. The farm is still there and open for visitors.

It is located on the southern edge of the Winterberg mountain range, in the Smaldeel (a narrow strip of grassland running laterally from Fort Beaufort to Somerset East, renowned for its sweet grass). The town suffered a major decline in fortunes in the latter half of the 20th century before reviving itself around the turn of the millennium. It is regarded today as an artist's haven and retirement village.

The lack of industry in the town, while a boon to those hoping to escape the rat race, means that the town has a large unemployment rate. The woes of the poor are exacerbated by a high HIV-AIDS infection rate.

The Bedford Provincial Hospital is situated in Maitland Street, three blocks northwest of the town's centre.

Most tourists visit Bedford to experience true South African farm living.

References

External links
http://www.bedford.co.za/ - The Bedford Homepage.

Populated places in the Raymond Mhlaba Local Municipality
Populated places established in 1854
Tourist attractions in the Eastern Cape
1854 establishments in the British Empire